The Wheelbarrow is a remotely controlled robot designed in 1972 for use by British Army bomb disposal teams operating in Northern Ireland (321 EOD), mainland Britain (11 EOD Regiment) and Iraq. Over 400 have been destroyed in operation, possibly saving the lives of their human counterparts.

Design and development
Peter Miller, a retired Lieutenant-Colonel of the Royal Tank regiment, conceived the idea in the aftermath of a period (1971 – 72) when the Royal Army Ordnance Corps (RAOC) lost eight Ammunition Technical Officers (ATO) on active duty in Northern Ireland. Tasked with finding a solution by Colonel George Styles, Miller recalled that he had developed a technique when modifying a lawnmower. A possible solution to the problem, Miller went to a local garden centre to buy a lawnmower, but instead was convinced by the store manager to buy an electrically powered wheelbarrow, Miller thought it was "ideal and bought one on the spot". The head of the RAOC’s Bomb Disposal School, Major Robert John Wilson Patterson, who invented the Pigstick - a device which fires an explosively-propelled jet of water to disrupt the circuitry of a bomb and disable it - had just begun to be used by the ATOs in Northern Ireland,  but was known to be "virtually useless against" car bombs. By incorporating the Pigstick into the Wheelbarrow, Patterson and Miller's inventiveness saved hundreds of lives.

The crude prototypes produced at CAD Kineton proved difficult to manoeuvre so a team at the then Military Vehicles and Engineering Establishment (MVEE, Chertsey) was tasked to improve the tracking and steering.

The Wheelbarrow has undergone several upgrades, the latest being the Wheelbarrow Revolution. The most notable feature in this model include the 360 degree arm which can be outfitted with various EOD attachments. The Wheelbarrow Revolution is also capable of climbing stairways.

A Mark 9 version of the Wheelbarrow built by Northrop Grumman was unveiled in 2010. It is presently used by the UK Metropolitan Police Service
.

References

Bomb disposal
Land warfare
Emergency services
Military robots
British Army equipment
Military equipment introduced in the 1970s
British inventions